Natarajan Higher Secondary School is situated in Kattunaickenpatti village, Thoothukudi district, Tamil Nadu, India.

Education System 
It comes under the Tamil Nadu Government Aided Schools category which follows the common Tamil Nadu Board of Secondary Education from Grade 6 to Grade 12. The co-education mode of the education system is followed.

Address 
Natarajan Hr. Sec. School,
Kattunaickenpatti,
Eppodumvendran Post -
628 712.
Thoothukudi Dt.

References 

High schools and secondary schools in Tamil Nadu